Du Toit's torrent frog, the Mt. Elgon torrent frog, or the Kenya rocky river frog (Arthroleptides dutoiti) is a species of frog in the family Petropedetidae endemic to Mount Elgon in Kenya; it has not been found on the Ugandan part of the mountain. It is one of many, often taxonomically unrelated, frogs referred to as torrent frogs.

The species was found by Cornelius Albertus du Toit, who collected the frog holotype in 1934. Dr. du Toit was a member of the Cape Town University, a founder member of the Zoological Society of South Africa, and Professor of Zoology at Stellenbosch University in South Africa. He wrote Zoological research in South Africa in 1961.

Description
Its head is slightly broader than long, with distinctly visible tympana. The toes but not the fingers are half-webbed. The skin of the back is distinctly warty and pitted, but smooth elsewhere. This species is black in colour, except for the digit tips that are slightly white-edged.

Habitat
A. dutoiti is found in and around rocky montane streams. Eggs are laid on wet rocks close to torrential streams and waterfalls, and the tadpoles develop on the rocks, out of the water.

Conservation
A. dutoiti is an EDGE species, reflecting its evolutionary distinctness and endangered status. It was last seen in 1962, despite later surveys. Because the habitat of this species appears to be generally in good condition, its disappearance might have been caused by disease such as chytridiomycosis.

References

Arthroleptides
EDGE species
Frogs of Africa
Amphibians of Kenya
Endemic fauna of Kenya
Amphibians described in 1935
Taxa named by Arthur Loveridge
Taxonomy articles created by Polbot